Los Barruecos is a natural monument in Malpartida de Cáceres, Extremadura, Spain.

It is located in the municipality of Malpartida de Cáceres, south of the urban centre. The area features granitic formations with landscape interest, together with artificial ponds, used in the past as wool washers. It houses colonies of white storks as well as cormorants, grebes and black-winged stilts. The area also features a number of archaeological remains, such as rock art in granite shelters and anthropomorphic tombs carved in granite. The Vostell Malpartida museum of contemporary art is also located in the area.

The Junta of Extremadura declared the landscape as natural monument in 1996.

Game of Thrones' episode "The Spoils of War" was shot in Los Barruecos.

References 

Natural monuments of Spain
Protected areas of Extremadura
Geography of the Province of Cáceres